The StoryGraph (sometimes shortened to just "StoryGraph") is a social cataloguing web platform for books, serving as a competitor of Goodreads (an Amazon-owned social cataloguing platform). The StoryGraph received awareness after Book Riot covered the platform's assets, including more personalized recommendations for readers, customized ratings options (including half-star ratings), and its non-affiliation with Amazon. The StoryGraph uses a freemium model, with some features only available in the paid subscription plan.

Design
The StoryGraph was created by software engineer Nadia Odunayo in 2019, initially as a side-project for tracking books. Based on the comments of Goodreads users and other book readers, Odunayo focused on the implementation of systems on the platform for personalized book recommendations.

In comparison to Goodreads
The StoryGraph is similar in many ways to Goodreads, being also a web platform designed for readers to keep track of the books they read, using metadata to build book profiles. Unlike Goodreads, The StoryGraph is more focused on the tracking aspect of book collecting, and lacks the same type of social homepage as Goodreads. The StoryGraph platform allows readers to log and rate their books, interact with friends on the site’s community page, and set reading challenges. The platform builds recommendations based on analyses of users’ reading habits. By scrolling over the "stats" tab on their profile page, readers get an evaluation of their online library broken down by mood, pace, length, genre, rating, etc. This function can be upgraded, for a monthly fee, to provide more advanced statistics. Unlike Goodreads, The StoryGraph offers the option to give books half or quarter star ratings.

Goodreads is considered to hold a monopoly in the field, consequently limiting the growth of similar sites. Tom Critchlow, a data consultant based in the United Kingdom, argued that Amazon's ownership of Goodreads would continue to hinder alternative platforms, saying, "Amazon has showed no mercy when dealing with competitors before. If you were to compete, you would need significant scale. Again, you’d be dealing with Amazon directly."

Reception
The StoryGraph is a functional but fairly new platform, and has received mixed opinions from critics and users. Chris M. Arnone of Book Riot commended The StoryGraph for not being affiliated with Amazon and for distancing itself from Amazon products, but criticized the platform for its lack of a strong social community, stating, "this is the most glaring place where The StoryGraph falls behind Goodreads. The community on Goodreads is huge, with multiple groups and social media connections to automatically add people you know in other spaces. The StoryGraph just doesn’t have any of that. There are no API tie-ins to other social media platforms at this time. This not only means you can’t import friends from Facebook or Twitter, but you can’t directly post from The StoryGraph to those platforms. While this might be something they’re working on, this lack of interaction hurt my review of The StoryGraph. The StoryGraph does provide the ability to search for similar users based on your reading preferences. That’s as far as the community goes right now." Mara Franzen, another writer for Book Riot, took a different view than her colleague, arguing, "I have been a die-hard Goodreads fan since 2016, but after spending time with Storygraph, I think I might make the switch. It’s just so much more user-friendly, and I was recommended so many books that I’m actually interested in. I loved being able to see my reading data and was even surprised by it a bit."

See also
 Goodreads
 LibraryThing

External links
 The StoryGraph official website: https://app.thestorygraph.com/

References

Internet properties established in 2019
Companies based in the City of London
Black-owned businesses
Social networking websites
Book review websites
Social cataloging applications